Jeremy Sharp (born 13 August 2001) is an Australian rules footballer who plays for the Gold Coast Suns in the Australian Football League (AFL). He was recruited by the Gold Coast Suns with the 27th draft pick in the 2019 AFL draft.

Early life
Sharp was born in Western Australia and grew up in the riverside Perth suburb of Attadale. He participated in the Auskick program at Attadale and played his junior football for the Attadale Bombers and attended Aquinas College throughout his upbringing. He also played for East Fremantle in the Western Australian Football League colts division, where he played six games and kicked 3 goals. Sharp represented Western Australia in the AFL Under 18 Championships in the 2018 and 2019 seasons. He was named in the Under 18 All Australian team for 2018 and 2019.

AFL career
Sharp was taken at pick 27 in the 2019 AFL draft, in a live trade with Geelong where Gold Coast swapped their future mid-first round selection and pick 64 for pick 27. It was the second 'live trade' to occur in the AFL.

Sharp debuted in the Suns' four point loss to St Kilda in the 10th round of the 2020 AFL season. On his debut, Sharp picked up 9 disposals and a mark. Sharp was nominated for the 2021 AFL Rising Star award after his performance in round 18 against , where he collected 30 disposals and 10 marks in a career-best performance.

Statistics
 Statistics are correct to the end of round 3, 2022

|- style="background-color: #EAEAEA"
! scope="row" style="text-align:center" | 2020
|style="text-align:center;"|
| 37 || 2 || 0 || 0 || 10 || 9 || 19 || 4 || 0 || 0.0 || 0.0 || 5.0 || 4.5 || 9.5 || 2.0 || 0.0 || 0
|- 
! scope="row" style="text-align:center" | 2021
|style="text-align:center;"|
| 37 || 9 || 2 || 3 || 113 || 52 || 165 || 53 || 7 || 0.2 || 0.3 || 12.6 || 5.8 || 18.3 || 5.9 || 0.8 || 1
|- style="background-color: #EAEAEA"
! scope="row" style="text-align:center" | 2022
|style="text-align:center;"|
| 20 || 3 || 2 || 0 || 29 || 14 || 43 || 8 || 6 || 0.7 || 0.0 || 9.7 || 4.7 || 14.3 || 2.7 || 2.0 || 0.0
|- style="background:#EAEAEA; font-weight:bold; width:2em"
| scope="row" text-align:center class="sortbottom" colspan=3 | Career
| 14
| 4
| 3
| 152
| 75
| 227
| 65
| 13
| 0.3
| 0.2
| 10.9
| 5.4
| 16.2
| 4.6
| 0.9
|}

Personal life
His grandfather, Ken Holt, is a member of the East Fremantle Football Club's Hall of Fame and represented Western Australia at the state level throughout his career.

References

External links

2001 births
Living people
Gold Coast Football Club players
Australian rules footballers from Western Australia
East Fremantle Football Club players
People educated at Aquinas College, Perth